U.S. Highway 61 (US 61) is a U.S. Highway in southeast and east-central Minnesota, which runs from the River Bridge over the Mississippi River at La Crescent and continues north to its northern terminus at its junction with Interstate 35 (I-35) at the city of Wyoming.

The highway connects the cities of La Crescent, Winona, Wabasha, Lake City, Red Wing, Hastings, Cottage Grove, Saint Paul, Forest Lake, and Wyoming.

Route description
US 61 enters the state of Minnesota at the city of La Crescent on the River Bridge over the Mississippi River between the cities of La Crosse and La Crescent.  US 61 runs concurrently with US 14 and State Highway 16 (MN 16) as it enters the state.  The four-lane divided highway continues north through La Crescent.  US 61 follows the Mississippi River through southeast Minnesota; through the cities of Winona, Wabasha, Lake City, and Red Wing.

US 61 is a two-lane roadway between Wabasha and Red Wing.  US 61 crosses the Mississippi River at Hastings over the new Hastings Bridge and joins US 10 at Cottage Grove. US 61 and US 10 run concurrently as a freeway between Cottage Grove and the city of Saint Paul.  Within the city of Saint Paul, US 61 follows I-94 for a short distance, and then follows Mounds Boulevard, East 7th Street, and Arcade Street through the east side of St. Paul.

US 61 then proceeds north to Maplewood, where it becomes a four-lane highway named Maplewood Drive to White Bear Lake. Between I-694 and the central business district of White Bear Lake, the road serves one of the Twin Cities region's major car dealership areas. After leaving White Bear Lake, US 61 is a two-lane roadway again to Forest Lake and then to its northern terminus at the city of Wyoming.  US 61 closely parallels I-35E and I-35 from Saint Paul to Wyoming.

Approximately  of US 61 from La Crescent to Cottage Grove in southeast Minnesota is officially designated the Disabled American Veterans Highway.  Legally, the Minnesota section of US 61 is defined as unmarked legislative routes 3, 104, 102 and 1 in the Minnesota Statutes. US 61 is not marked with these legislative numbers along the actual highway.

History
US 61 in Minnesota is an original U.S. Highway, established on November 26, 1926. It originally extended north to the Canadian border at Grand Portage, but it was cut back to its present terminus in 1991. The portion between Duluth and Grand Portage is now MN 61. Segments of the old alignment that parallel MN 61 and I-35 have been designated County Road 61 (CR 61).

In 1929, the only unpaved portions were from Hastings to Wabasha and from Winona to the state line. It was completely paved by 1940.

The expressway sections south of Wabasha were built in the 1960s and the 1970s. The four lane divided highway section between Red Wing and MN 316 near Miesville was completed in 1997. The freeway section of US 61 between Cottage Grove and I-494 at Newport was completed in 2007.

The US 61 Hastings High Bridge received considerable attention from increased bridge inspections in 2008 following the August 1, 2007, I-35W Bridge collapse in nearby Minneapolis.  The Hastings High Bridge, a steel arch structure built in 1951, is structurally deficient and shows considerable deterioration. It is also a notorious traffic bottleneck because it has only one lane each way and dumps southbound US 61 traffic into downtown Hastings. Starting in October 2010, the Hastings bridge will be replaced, with the projected completion in 2013.

Major intersections

See also
Highway 61 Revisited (song) and album

Further reading

References

External links

61
 Minnesota
061
U.S. Route 61
U.S. Route 61
U.S. Route 61
U.S. Route 61
U.S. Route 61
U.S. Route 61
U.S. Route 61
U.S. Route 61